Alidzhon Karomatulloyevich Karomatullozoda ((), born 5 May 2002) is a Tajikistani professional football player who plays for Istiklol and the Tajikistan national football team.

Career

Club
On 31 March 2022, Istiklol confirmed the signing of Karomatullozoda.

International
Alidzhon made his senior team debut on 15 June 2021 against Myanmar, coming on as a half-time substitute for Manuchehr Safarov.

Career statistics

Club

International

Statistics accurate as of match played 11 June 2022

Honors
Istiklol
 Tajikistan Higher League (1):2022
 Tajikistan Cup (1): 2022
 Tajik Supercup (1): 2022

Tajikistan
King's Cup: 2022

References

2002 births
Living people
Tajikistani footballers
Tajikistan international footballers
Association football defenders